The 2014 Japanese Championship Super Formula season was the forty-second season of the premier series in Japanese open-wheel motor racing, and the second under the name of Super Formula. 2014 was also the first season using the new chassis, the Dallara SF14, which replaced the Swift SF09 used in previous seasons. The season began on 13 April and ended on 9 November after seven rounds.

2012 champion Kazuki Nakajima claimed his second title in three seasons, after a consistent campaign, in which he scored points in each of the nine races to be held. Nakajima won races at Fuji and Suzuka as the TOM'S driver won the championship by 6.5 points, ahead of Impul's João Paulo de Oliveira. De Oliveira was the season's most frequent winner, with three victories, winning at Fuji, Suzuka and Motegi. Third place in the championship went to Nakajima's team-mate, André Lotterer. Lotterer won races at Fuji and Autopolis, but missed out on a chance to compete for the championship, after missing the Motegi round to make his Formula One début with Caterham at the Belgian Grand Prix.

The only other drivers to win races during the season were Team LeMans' Loïc Duval, who won the season-opening round at Suzuka. Like Lotterer, he missed a race – at Fuji – as he was still recovering from his accident suffered during practice for the 24 Hours of Le Mans. Tomoki Nojiri was the season's other winner, winning at Sportsland SUGO for Team Dandelion Racing. The performances of Nakajima, Lotterer and Andrea Caldarelli (replacing Lotterer at Motegi) were enough for TOM'S to win the teams' championship, finishing 33.5 points clear of the next best team, Team LeMans.

Teams and drivers

Race calendar and results
A provisional calendar for the 2014 season was released on 8 November 2013. All races were held in Japan.

Championship standings

Drivers' Championship
Scoring system

Teams' Championship

References

External links
Japanese Championship Super Formula official website 

2014
Super Formula
Super Formula